Constantine Kollias (1901 – 13 July 1998) was a Greek Attorney General of the Supreme Civil and Criminal Court who was proclaimed Prime Minister by the far right-wing military junta, which ruled the country from 1967 until 1974.

Biography

Kollias was born in 1901 in the village of Stylia, Xylokastro-Evrostina, in the province of Korinthia, Kingdom of Greece. He died in Athens on 13 July 1998.

Kollias was Attorney General of Greece during the period 1941-1944 when Greece was occupied by three Axis forces (Germany, Italy and Bulgaria). He was responsible for persecuting resistance members during the occupation, and was indicted after liberation for his actions. According to a published study by Dimitris Kousouris (2014: p.155)  

Kollias was proclaimed Prime Minister by the far-right military junta on 21 April 1967, the very day of the coup d'état that overthrew Panagiotis Kanellopoulos' legitimate government.  However, nearly eight months later, he was replaced by the head of the military coup d'état Georgios Papadopoulos after the unsuccessful counter-coup of King Constantine II on 13 December 1967.

Kollias died on 13 July 1998, at the age of 96.

References

1901 births
1998 deaths
20th-century prime ministers of Greece
Prime Ministers of Greece
Leaders of the Greek junta
Greek anti-communists
Greek monarchists
Greek collaborators with Nazi Germany
Corruption in Greece
1967 in Greece
People from Xylokastro